The Royal Automobile Club of Belgium (RACB) is an association of Belgian motorists founded in January 1896. Their missions are focused on assistance, advice and sport.

Championships 
 Belcar
 Belgian Rally Championship
 Belgian Rallycross Championship
 Belgian Hill Climb Championship
 Belgian Karting Championship

Presidents 

 Count François van der Straten Ponthoz (1896–1902)
 Count Arthur de Hemricourt de Grunne (1902–1911)
 Robert d'Ursel (1911–1955)
 Amaury de Merode (1955–????)
 Pierre Ugeux (????–????)

 Count Gérard de Liedekerke (1979–1994) / John Dils (1991–1999)
 Philippe Roberti de Winghe (1997–2001) / Charles de Fierlant (1999–2001)
 Baron John J. Goossens (2001–2002)
 Baron  (2002–)

References

External links
 

Automobile associations
Auto racing organizations
Clubs and societies in Belgium
Organizations established in 1896
1896 establishments in Belgium